Marina Gatell Poch (b. Sabadell, Catalonia, Spain; July 11, 1979) is a Spanish actress.

Filmography

Feature films 
 2021, Two
 2010, Maximum Shame
 2010, Pa Negre
 2009, Little Ashes
 2008, Intrusos (en Manasés)
 2007, The Ungodly
 2006, Va a ser que nadie es perfecto
 2003, Cocó
 2002, Lisístrata
 2000, Nosotras

TV
 2021, La cocinera de Castamar
 2010, Física o química
 2008 - 2009, Lalola
 2008, Zoo
 2007, Ventdelplà
 2007, Després de la pluja
 2007, MIR
 2006, El Mundo de Chema
 2006, Mobbing
 2006, I figli strappati
 2005, Lo Cartanyà
 2005, Viure de mentides
 2002-2004, Majoria absoluta
 2004, Crusader
 2003, Fragments
 2001, Hospital Central
 2000, 7 vidas
 2000, Tres en joc
 1999, Pepe Carvalho

References

External links
Marina Gatell's official website

1979 births
Living people
Spanish film actresses
Spanish television actresses
People from Sabadell
21st-century Spanish actresses